was a Japanese racecar driver. Kazato started his career at age 19. He took part in the 1971 Can-Am season, finishing 10th in the championship driving a Lola T222-Chevrolet. He graduated from Seikei University in 1973.

He died at 25 years old at Fuji Speedway, during a Fuji Grand Champion series race after colliding with Seiichi Suzuki on the banking, resulting in the circuit being modified to eliminate the 30-degree banking, establishing the modern configuration with the hairpin that bypasses the banking.

Resources 
 Motorsport Memorial

1949 births
1974 deaths
Japanese racing drivers
European Formula Two Championship drivers
Racing drivers who died while racing
Sport deaths in Japan
People from Chiba Prefecture
Sportspeople from Chiba Prefecture